Đam Rông is a rural district of Lâm Đồng province in the Central Highlands region of Vietnam. As of 2009 the district had a population of 38,400. The district covers an area of 892.2 km². The district capital lies at Đam Rông.

References

Districts of Lâm Đồng province